Toivo Mikael Kivimäki (5 June 1886 – 6 May 1968), (J.D.), was a Finnish politician of the National Progressive Party who served as the head of the department of civil law at Helsinki University 1931–1956, Prime Minister of Finland 1932–1936, and Finland's Envoy to Berlin 1940–1944.

Early career 
He was elected as member of the Parliament for terms 1922, 1924-1927 and 1929–1940. 
Before prime ministership, Kivimäki served as Minister of the Interior 1928-1929 and Minister of Justice 1931–1932.

After WWII 
In 1946, Kivimäki together with half-a-dozen other leading politicians were put on "war-responsibility trials" executed under pressure from the Allied victors in World War II. Kivimäki was sentenced to five years in prison after being found responsible for the Continuation War. After Finland signed the Paris Peace Treaties, 1947, and the  Finno–Soviet Agreement of Friendship, Cooperation, and Mutual Assistance, 1948, the international situation was deemed somewhat stabilized, and Kivimäki was pardoned. He returned to his career in academia.

Legacy 
As with all politicians connected with the Continuation War, Kivimäki was for decades seen in a somewhat critical light. During the era of finlandization, many prominent Finns expressed themselves cautiously on such subjects in order not to disturb sensitive Allied victors of the war; a cautiousness that without doubt influenced Finland's post-war generation's understanding and views.

 As Prime Minister, Kivimäki headed Finland's (until 1987) most long-lived cabinet, aiming at stabilizing the turbulent politics in Finland after the semi-fascist Mäntsälä Rebellion had been put down.
 He achieved the reversal of Finland's foreign policy into a neutralist pro-Scandinavian stance, and a Swedish rapprochement, that may well have been prepared for in the most initiated circles, but that in the contemporary tense phase of the language strife in Finland was not at all easy to explain to the public opinion.
 As an Envoy to the Third Reich, Kivimäki was in a position to observe the anti-Semitic nature of the Nazi regime and the disappearance of German Jews to concentration camps. Kivimäki succeeded in reversing Nazi Germany's anti-Finnish stance, obtaining support and favours but at the price of Finland having to form an alliance with Hitler. Finland avoided formal treaties with Nazi Germany up until the Ryti-Ribbentrop Agreement, which was signed after the fall of Viipuri in June 1944.

Several individuals and factors were critical for the Winter War and the Continuation War. Kivimäki without any doubt occupies a prominent position among pro-Axis Finnish leaders.

Cabinets
 Kivimäki Cabinet

References 

1886 births
1968 deaths
People from Tarvasjoki
People from Turku and Pori Province (Grand Duchy of Finland)
Finnish Party politicians
National Progressive Party (Finland) politicians
Prime Ministers of Finland
Ministers of the Interior of Finland
Ministers of Justice of Finland
Members of the Parliament of Finland (1922–24)
Members of the Parliament of Finland (1924–27)
Members of the Parliament of Finland (1929–30)
Members of the Parliament of Finland (1930–33)
Members of the Parliament of Finland (1933–36)
Members of the Parliament of Finland (1936–39)
Members of the Parliament of Finland (1939–45)
Finnish people of World War II
Continuation War
Recipients of Finnish presidential pardons
University of Helsinki alumni
Academic staff of the University of Helsinki
Finnish bankers
Finnish prisoners and detainees
Prisoners and detainees of Finland